The Outlaw Inn in Rock Springs, Wyoming, at 1630 Elk St., was listed on the National Register of Historic Places in 2018.

Don Anselmi and his brother Jan Anselmi, Mike Vase and Vern Delgado borrowed $1.5 million to build the hotel. It was opened in 1996. It was built in 1965–66 to be, and remains, a Best Western chain hotel.  It has 33 drive-up rooms and 67 courtside rooms.

Rocky Mountain Hospitality LLC acquired the hotel in 2013.

References

External links
Outlaw Inn, Best Western

National Register of Historic Places in Sweetwater County, Wyoming
Hotels in Wyoming
Buildings and structures completed in 1966